The Wastrel is a 1961 Italian-Cypriot drama film directed by Michael Cacoyannis and starring Ellie Lambeti. It was entered into the 1961 Cannes Film Festival.

Cast
 Ellie Lambeti as Mrs. Bell
 Van Heflin as Duncan Bell
 Franco Fabrizi as Rudi Veronese 
 Fosco Giachetti as Captain Hugh Hardy 
 Annie Gorassini as Monique
 Clelia Matania as Betsy 
 Renata Mauro as Moglie del governatore 
 Tiberio Mitri as Macniff 
 Paul Muller
 Rosalba Neri as  La ragazza nel night club

See also
 List of Cypriot films
 Attilas '74
 Akamas

References

External links

1961 films
Cypriot drama films
English-language Italian films
1961 drama films
Italian black-and-white films
Films directed by Michael Cacoyannis
Films shot in Cyprus
Films with screenplays by Suso Cecchi d'Amico
Italian drama films
1960s English-language films
1960s Italian films